Osceola is a city in Clarke County, Iowa, United States. The population was 5,160 at the time of the 2020 census. It is the county seat of Clarke County.

History

Osceola was named after a Seminole Indian leader of the same name. Osceola is an anglicised form of Asiyahola: assi, from a ceremonial yaupon holly tea or "black drink" and yaholi, the name of a Creek god intoned when the drink was served.

The Masonic Building stands on the public square in Osceola. Built in 1872, this Italianate building was used by Osceola Lodge No. 77 of the Ancient Free & Accepted Masons, and the main floor was a bank and hardware store. This building was placed on the Iowa Historic Preservation Alliance’s Most Endangered list due to its poor repair and lack of preservation plan. In 2011 the building was renovated with help from various grants. The second and third floors were converted into upscale apartments. The China Star restaurant was remodeled and now utilizes both halves of the lower level. The exterior received an overdue face lift to restore the building to its original appearance. All of the windows were replaced and the stucco was repaired and painted. Structural improvements  included foundation work and a new roof. The front entrances were replaced with a more traditional wood columns and tall glass windows.

Lakeside Casino Resort operates on West Lake. The river boat-themed casino has been in continuous operation since about 2000, although it has been bought and sold twice since it has opened. Terrible Herbst gaming purchased the casino around 2005. After a major renovation to the complex, which included a $1 million 132-foot-tall sign along the adjacent interstate, took place around 2006. The parent company filed for bankruptcy and the casino was sold yet again. The original and familiar Lakeside name was brought back and the large cowboy sign along the interstate was converted into a slightly smaller, more traditional sign.

A Pilot truck stop was built in late 2010 along the interstate, in place of the former Terribles Casino gas station.

Geography
Osceola is located at the junction of Interstate 35 and U.S. Routes 34 and 69.

Climate

According to the Köppen Climate Classification system, Osceola has a hot-summer humid continental climate, abbreviated "Dfa" on climate maps.

Demographics

2010 census
At the 2010 census there were 4,929 people, 1,974 households, and 1,208 families living in the city. The racial makup of the city was 91.0% White, 0.6% African American, 0.4% Native American, 0.6% Asian, 0.1% Pacific Islander, 6.2% from other races, and 1.2% from two or more races. Hispanic or Latino people of any race were 17.6%.

Of the 1,974 households 32.3% had children under the age of 18 living with them, 45.4% were married couples living together, 11.5% had a female householder with no husband present, 4.3% had a male householder with no wife present, and 38.8% were non-families. 32.8% of households were one person and 15.8% were one person aged 65 or older. The average household size was 2.43 and the average family size was 3.10.

The median age was 36.8 years. 26.1% of residents were under the age of 18; 9.3% were between the ages of 18 and 24; 23.5% were from 25 to 44; 23.8% were from 45 to 64; and 17.3% were 65 or older. The gender makeup of the city was 48.5% male and 51.5% female.

2000 census
As of the census of 2000, there were 4,659 people, 1,945 households, and 1,229 families living in the city. The 
The racial makup of the city was 95.73% White, 0.11% African American, 0.19% Native American, 0.58% Asian, 0.06% Pacific Islander, 2.75% from other races, and 0.58% from two or more races. Hispanic or Latino people of any race were 6.25% of the population.

Of the 1,945 households 29.8% had children under the age of 18 living with them, 49.7% were married couples living together, 10.1% had a female householder with no husband present, and 36.8% were non-families. 31.7% of households were one person and 17.4% were one person aged 65 or older. The average household size was 2.36 and the average family size was 2.98.

The age distribution was25.6% under the age of 18, 8.5% from 18 to 24, 25.6% from 25 to 44, 21.4% from 45 to 64, and 18.8% 65 or older. The median age was 38 years. For every 100 females, there were 89.9 males. For every 100 females age 18 and over, there were 85.1 males.

The median household income was $32,701 and the median family income  was $45,263. Males had a median income of $31,674 versus $21,684 for females. The per capita income for the city was $17,244. About 5.2% of families and 7.6% 
of the population were below the poverty line, including 13.3% of those under age 18 and 7.7% of those age 65 or over.

Infrastructure

Transportation
Amtrak, the national passenger rail system, provides service to Osceola, operating its California Zephyr daily in both directions between Chicago and Emeryville. A bus connection is available from Osceola to Des Moines.

Water
Water is drawn out of West lake to supply the community.

Notable people 

 Dorothy Clark, author known under joint pen name Clark McMeekin; born in Osceola
 Dwight Harken, surgeon and cardiac surgery innovator
 Edgar Howard, Lieutenant Governor of Nebraska and sixth-term member of the [[United States House of 
 W. Ward Reynoldson, Chief Justice of the Iowa Supreme Court

Gallery

References

External links

 
City-Data - comprehensive statistical data and more about Osceola

 
Cities in Clarke County, Iowa
Cities in Iowa
County seats in Iowa